Emergency is a 2022 American thriller comedy-drama film directed by Carey Williams and written by K.D. Dávila, based on their 2018 short film of the same name. It stars RJ Cyler, Donald Elise Watkins, and Sebastian Chacon as three college students who must weigh the pros and cons of calling the police when faced with an unexpected situation.

The film had its world premiere at the 38th Sundance Film Festival on January 20, 2022, where Dávila won the Waldo Salt Screenwriting Award. It began a limited theatrical release in the United States on May 20, 2022, followed by its streaming release on Amazon Prime Video on May 27, 2022. It received positive reviews from critics, who particularly praised Dávila's screenplay. The film was nominated for Best First Screenplay at the 38th Independent Spirit Awards, while Williams earned nominations for Outstanding Independent Film and Outstanding Emerging Director at the 23rd Black Reel Awards.

Plot
Best friends and college students Sean and Kunle prepare to become the first black men to complete the "Legendary Tour", a practice of visiting seven fraternity parties in one night. Along with their Latino friend and roommate Carlos, they discover the unconscious body of Emma, an underaged white woman, in their living room. Sean argues that if they call the police, the color of their skin would be enough to raise suspicion. Kunle convinces the group to take Emma to a hospital 10 minutes away. Meanwhile, Emma's sister Maddy and her friends Alice and Rafael start to look for her.

The three friends first try an alternate option - dumping Emma's body off outside of one of the parties. As Kunle leaves them to be the lookout, an incident leads several students to chase him off the property and throw objects at their car, shattering a taillight. Maddy uses a phone tracker app to find Emma's location. Carlos accidentally gives Emma a bottle of alcoholic "Death Punch", mistaking it for a sports drink. Sean is unable to convince his relative to lend him his car. Emma regains consciousness and begins to scream when she sees she is inside a stranger's vehicle. She breaks Carlos's nose and kicks Kunle in the face, causing them to crash the car. Emma then runs off into the woods and the three of them chase after her. They find her passed out in a tree and bring her back into their vehicle as Maddy, Alice, and Rafael find them.

Maddy attacks Sean and Kunle with a branch and accidentally pepper sprays herself. Carlos and Rafael, who reveal they are cousins, calm the rest of the group down and explain the situation, though Maddy remains skeptical, asking Emma if any of them assaulted her. Carlos asks how they were able to track Emma, and Maddy reveals that her phone was tucked into her bra, convincing the group that they were truly trying to help her. A scared Sean abandons the group and goes to the "underground", the last frat party of the "Legendary Tour". Emma begins to overdose as Carlos drives everyone to the hospital. As Kunle performs CPR to save Emma's life, the group is chased by the police, who believe they have kidnapped Emma. They are stopped by the police just as they make it to the emergency room. The police point a gun at Kunle, the only black man in the car. Alice later explains the situation to the police. Kunle and Carlos are allowed to leave. A white police officer tells Kunle that they should have just called the police in the first place. Sean and Kunle reunite and make up.

The morning after the events, Emma and Maddy bring a gift basket to the boys' house and Emma apologizes before Maddy tells her to wait outside. As Maddy begins to read a handwritten apology about involving the police, Kunle shuts the door in her face. While playing a round of Jenga, Sean notices Kunle showing symptoms of post-traumatic stress disorder at the sound of distant sirens.

Cast

Production
The short film Emergency won the Special Jury Prize at the 2018 Sundance Film Festival and the Grand Jury Prize at the 2018 SXSW. KD Dávila's screenplay made the 2020 Black List of most popular un-produced scripts from up-and-coming screenwriters. The project was in development with Temple Hill Entertainment and Amazon Studios. In April 2021, it was announced RJ Cyler, Sabrina Carpenter, Donald Elise Watkins, Sebastian Chacon, Maddie Nichols, Madison Thompson, Diego Abraham, and Melanie Jeffcoat were added to the cast. Principal photography took place in spring 2021.

Reception

Critical response

References

External links
 

2022 films
2022 comedy-drama films
2022 thriller drama films
2020s American films
2020s comedy thriller films
2020s English-language films
2020s satirical films
Amazon Prime Video original films
Amazon Studios films
American comedy-drama films
American comedy thriller films
American satirical films
American thriller drama films
Features based on short films
Films about racism in the United States
Films set in universities and colleges
Sundance Film Festival award winners
Temple Hill Entertainment films
2022 independent films